James William Barke (22 May 1905 - 20 March 1958) was a Scottish novelist.

Biography
Born in Torwoodlee, near Galashiels, Selkirkshire, Barke was the fourth child of James Bark, a dairyman and Jane, a dairymaid. In 1907, the family moved to Tulliallan in Fife, where he attended Tulliallan parish school. In 1918, they moved to Glasgow, where he attended Hamilton Crescent public school. He trained as an engineer and worked as the manager of a shipbuilding firm. He was involved in local and nationalist politics. His obituary states that he: "Wrote and felt as a conscious proletarian, in a period when proletarian self-consciousness was particularly strong". His first novel, The World his Pillow was published in 1933. He also married Nan Coats in this year. The couple went on to have two sons.

After 1945, Barke resigned from his job, and the family moved to Ayrshire, where he worked on The Immortal Memory, his series of five novels based on the life of Robert Burns. The novels were popular with readers, but not with Burns scholars. The family returned to Glasgow in 1955. Barke died on 20 March 1958. His funeral was addressed by Hugh MacDiarmid.

Fiction
His first three novels are set in the Highlands of Scotland, treating the subject of the sadness and bitterness of the empty glens and straths following the Highland Clearances.  The fourth, Major Operation, is a novel about Glasgow's Clydeside during the Great Depression. The Land of the Leal moves to the Scottish Lowlands. His Immortal Memory quintet was about the life of the poet, Robert Burns.

Bibliography

 The World his Pillow, 1933
 The Wild MacRaes, 1934
 The End of the High Bridge, 1935
 Major Operation, 1936
 The Land of the Leal, 1939
 The Immortal Memory quintet
 The Wind that Shakes the Barley, 1946
 The Song in the Green Thorn Tree, 1947
 The Wonder of all the Gay World, 1949
 The Crest of the Broken Wave, 1953
 Bonnie Jean, 1959
The Merry Muses of Caledonia: A Collection of Bawdy Folksongs, Ancient and Modern (with Sydney Goodsir Smith & John DeLancey Ferguson)

References

Further reading
 Bonnar, Robert, James Barke: A True Son of the Soil, in Kemp-Ashraf, Jack (ed.) (1966), Essays in Honour of William Gallacher, Humboldt-Universitat zu Berlin
 Manson, John, Ploughmen and Byremen: Novels of Barke, McNellie and Bryce, in Ross, Raymond (ed.), Cencrastus No. 52, Summer 1995, pp. 3 – 5,

External links
 

1905 births
1958 deaths
20th-century British novelists
Scottish novelists
Scottish socialists